Sphaerofijia is a genus of flies in the family Stratiomyidae.

Species
Sphaerofijia evazaeformis Bezzi, 1928

References

Stratiomyidae
Brachycera genera
Taxa named by Mario Bezzi
Diptera of Asia